Surrex is a hamlet in the civil parish of Coggeshall, and the Braintree district of Essex, England.

Surrex largely comprises modern housing development and a small retail and business area.

Surrex was previously in the civil parish of Feering, and from 1854 in the ecclesiastical parish of Great Tey. In 1933, commercial listings for the hamlet in Feering included a farmer, a beer retailer, and a threshing machine proprietor.

In 2014, following road safety concerns, particularly those expressed by local MP Priti Patel, Surrex settlement entry signs were placed on the A120. The signs caused some initial confusion and ridicule from local people and councillors, however, a later report stated that the signs were seen as being successful in reducing traffic speed.

A former public house, from 2008 The Queens Head (previously named "The Surrex Inn, the American Pilot, the East Anglian Roadhouse and the Porterhouse Inn"), closed in 2011 and became derelict. The building, then owned by a Chinese investor, was destroyed by fire in August 2017.

References 

Hamlets in Essex
Coggeshall